Martin Karl (3 June 1911 – 1 March 1942) was a German rower who competed in the 1936 Summer Olympics.

In 1936 he won the gold medal as member of the German boat in the coxless four competition. He was killed during WWII while serving on the Eastern Front.

References

External links
profile

1911 births
1942 deaths
Olympic rowers of Germany
Rowers at the 1936 Summer Olympics
Olympic gold medalists for Germany
Olympic medalists in rowing
German male rowers
Medalists at the 1936 Summer Olympics
Sportspeople from Würzburg
German military personnel killed in World War II
European Rowing Championships medalists